Laurent Delahousse (born 30 August 1969) is a French journalist and documentary filmmaker. He is best known for hosting the Journal de 20 heures news bulletin and Un jour, un destin biographical show, all on France 2.

Education 
Delahousse holds a master's degree in business and labour law, as well as a DEA in private sector law (the North-American equivalent of which would be an LL.M.).

Career 
In 1994, he began his career at RTL,  France's number 1 radio, as a political correspondent. In 1996, he joined LCI, TF1's all-news channel. In 1999, he joined M6 as its chief editor and presenter of the newsmagazine De quel droit? (By what right?), followed by Jour J (D-Day).

Since March 2000, he has been co-editor-in-chief and presenter of Secrets de l'actualité (News Secrets). Since 2001, he has also been a presenter for evening news specials such as the one on the 2003 invasion of Iraq.

In September 2006, he joined France 2 where he replaced Carole Gaessler as fellow newspresenter David Pujadas' anchor on the 8pm newscast.

Since January 2007, Delahousse has hosted his own show, a documentary series profiling key figures who have made a lasting impression on the public.

From February to June 2007, he also presented a weekly political show, Un dimanche de campagne.

On 25 February 2007, Laurent Delahousse was chosen to host the week-end news.

Since September 2007, he has been presenting a weekly current affairs show called 13h15.

In 2017-18, Delahousse hosted  on Sundays.

References 

1969 births
Living people
People from Croix, Nord
21st-century French journalists
French television journalists
French male journalists
French television presenters
French male non-fiction writers